Al Joudi v. Bush
(Civil Action No. 05-cv-301) is a writ of habeas corpus filed on behalf of several Guantanamo detainees, including: Majid Abdulla Al Joudi, Yousif Mohammad Mubarak Al-Shehri, Abdulla Mohammad Al Ghanmi and Abdul-Hakim Abdul-Rahman Al-Moosa, before US District Court Judge Gladys Kessler.  It was one of over 200 habeas corpus petitions filed on behalf of detainees held in the Guantanamo Bay detention camp in Cuba.

Lead Counsel

In January 2007 the Center for Constitution Rights published a list of the counsels of the "lead petitioners" in the captives various habeas petitions.
The list records Martin Flumenbaum and Tarver Julia Mason of PAUL WEISS RIFKIND WHARTON & GARRISON LLP as the counsel to the lead petitioner on this petition.

Seizure of privileged lawyer-client documents

On June 10, 2006 the Department of Defense reported that three captives died in custody.
The Department of Defense stated that the three men committed suicide.
Camp authorities called the deaths "an act of asymmetric warfare", and suspected plans had been coordinated by the captive's attorneys—so they seized all the captives' documents, including the captives' copies of their habeas documents.
Since the habeas documents were privileged lawyer-client communication the 
Department of Justice was compelled to file documents about the document seizures.
Majid Abdulla Al Joudi and Abdulla Mohammad Al Ghanmi's papers were seized.

Military Commissions Act

The Military Commissions Act of 2006 mandated that Guantanamo captives were no longer entitled to access the US civil justice system, so all outstanding habeas corpus petitions were stayed.

Boumediene v. Bush

On June 12, 2008 the United States Supreme Court ruled, in Boumediene v. Bush, that the Military Commissions Act could not remove the right for Guantanamo captives to access the US Federal Court system.  And all previous Guantanamo captives' habeas petitions were eligible to be re-instated.
The judges considering the captives' habeas petitions would be considering whether the evidence used to compile the allegations the men and boys were enemy combatants justified a classification of "enemy combatant".

Repatriated captives seeking relief

On 17 April 2007 the United States Department of Justice moved to dismiss several hundred habeas petitions because the captives had been set free, repatriated, or died in custody.
Majid Abdulla Al Joudi and Abdulla Mohammad Al Ghanmi were among those the DoJ requested to be dismissed.
US District Court Judge Thomas F. Hogan list this petition as one where former captives were entitled to seek relief for their detention.

References

Guantanamo captives' habeas corpus petitions